Table tennis at the 2018 Commonwealth Games was held at the Oxenford Studios on the Gold Coast, Australia from April 5 to 15. A total of nine events are scheduled to be held, three each for men and women and a mixed doubles event. A further two para sport events are also scheduled to be held.

Medal table

Medallists

Para

Participating nations
There are 35 participating nations in Table tennis with a total of 160 athletes.

References

External links
 Results Book – Table tennis

 
2018
Commonwealth Games
2018 Commonwealth Games events
Table tennis competitions in Australia